Conchita Martínez and Barbara Paulus were the defending champions but did not compete that year.

Laura Garrone and Laura Golarsa won in the final 6–4, 7–5 against Silke Meier and Elena Pampoulova.

Seeds
Champion seeds are indicated in bold text while text in italics indicates the round in which those seeds were eliminated.

 Iva Budařová /  Petra Langrová (first round)
 Tracey Morton /  Heidi Sprung (semifinals)
 Marzia Grossi /  Barbara Romanò (quarterfinals)
 Laura Garrone /  Laura Golarsa (champions)

Draw

External links
 1989 Vitosha New Otani Open Doubles Draw

Vitosha New Otani Open
1989 WTA Tour